Carrageenans or carrageenins are a family of natural linear sulfated polysaccharides that are extracted from red edible seaweeds. Carrageenans are widely used in the food industry, for their gelling, thickening, and stabilizing properties. Their main application is in dairy and meat products, due to their strong binding to food proteins. In recent years, carrageenans have emerged as a promising candidate in tissue engineering and regenerative medicine applications as they resemble native glycosaminoglycans (GAGs). They have been mainly used for tissue engineering, wound coverage and drug delivery. 

Carrageenans contain 15-40% ester-sulfate content, which makes them anionic polysaccharides. They can be mainly categorized into three different classes based on their sulfate content. Kappa-carrageenan has one sulfate group per disaccharide, iota-carrageenan has two, and lambda-carrageenan has three.

The most well-known and most important red seaweed used for manufacturing the hydrophilic colloids to produce carrageenan is Chondrus crispus (Irish moss), which is a dark red parsley-like plant that grows attached to rocks. Gelatinous extracts of the Chondrus crispus seaweed have been used as food additives since approximately the fifteenth century. Carrageenan is a vegetarian and vegan alternative to gelatin in some applications, so may be used to replace gelatin in confectionery and other food. There is no clinical evidence for carrageenan as an unsafe food ingredient, mainly because its fate after digestion is inadequately determined.

The first industrial scale commercial cultivation of Eucheuma and Kappaphycus spp. for carrageenan was developed in the Philippines. The global top producers of carrageenan are the Philippines and Indonesia. Carrageenan, along with agar, are used to produce traditional jelly desserts in the Philippines called gulaman.

Properties 

Carrageenans are large, highly flexible molecules that form curling helical structures. This gives them the ability to form a variety of different gels at room temperature. They are widely used in the food and other industries as thickening and stabilizing agents.

All carrageenans are high-molecular-weight polysaccharides and mainly made up of alternating 3-linked b-D-galac- topyranose (G-units) and 4-linked a-D-galactopyranose (D-units) or 4-linked 3,6-anhydro-a-D-galactopyranose (DA-units), forming the disaccharide repeating unit of carrageenans.

There are three main commercial classes of carrageenan:

 Kappa forms strong, rigid gels in the presence of potassium ions, and reacts with dairy proteins. It is sourced mainly from Kappaphycus alvarezii.
 Iota forms soft gels in the presence of calcium ions. It is produced mainly from Eucheuma denticulatum.
 Lambda does not gel, and is used to thicken dairy products.

The primary differences that influence the properties of kappa, iota, and lambda carrageenan are the number and position of the ester sulfate groups on the repeating galactose units. Higher levels of ester sulfate lower the solubility temperature of the carrageenan and produce lower strength gels, or contribute to gel inhibition (lambda carrageenan).

Many red algal species produce different types of carrageenans during their developmental history. For instance, the genus Gigartina produces mainly kappa carrageenans during its gametophytic stage, and lambda carrageenans during its sporophytic stage.

All are soluble in hot water, but in cold water, only the lambda form (and the sodium salts of the other two) are soluble.

When used in food products, carrageenan has the EU additive E numbers E407 or E407a when present as "processed eucheuma seaweed". Technically carrageenan is considered a dietary fibre.

In parts of Scotland and Ireland, where it is known by a variety of local and native names, Chondrus crispus is boiled in milk and strained, before sugar and other flavourings such as vanilla, cinnamon, brandy, or whisky are added. The end-product is a kind of jelly similar to panna cotta, tapioca, or blancmange.

Production 

It is then cooled for 24 hours, during which time it becomes gelatinous.

, global sales of carrageenan were estimated at $640 million. The largest producer of industrial carrageenan was the Philippines, where cultivated seaweed produces about 80% of the world supply, while China is the main exporter to global markets in the US and Europe. The most commonly used sources are E. cottonii (Kappaphycus alvarezii, K. striatum) and E. spinosum (Eucheuma denticulatum), which together provide about three-quarters of the world production.

The E. cottonii variety has been reclassified as Kappaphycus cottonii by Maxwell Doty (1988), thereby introducing the genus Kappaphycus, on the basis of the phycocolloids produced (namely kappa carrageenan).

After harvest, the seaweed is dried, baled, and sent to the carrageenan manufacturer. There the seaweed is ground, sifted to remove impurities such as sand, and washed thoroughly. After treatment with hot alkali solution (e.g., 5–8% potassium hydroxide), the cellulose is removed from the carrageenan by centrifugation and filtration. The resulting carrageenan solution is then concentrated by evaporation. It is dried and ground to specification.

There are three types of industrial processing:

Semi-refined

This is only produced from E. cottonii or E. spinosum. The raw weed is first sorted and crude contaminants are removed by hand. The weed is then washed to remove salt and sand, and then cooked in hot alkali to increase the gel strength. The cooked weed is washed, dried, and milled. E. spinosum undergoes a much milder cooking cycle, as it dissolves quite readily. The product is called semi-refined carrageenan, Philippines natural grade, or, in the U.S., it simply falls under the common carrageenan specification.

                            cleaned and washed seaweed 
                                    ↓
                                 extraction
                                    ↓
                              coarse filtration   → seaweed residue
                                    ↓ 
                               fine filtration    → used filter aids
                                    ↓
             ↓-------------- concentration --------------↓
    preparation with KCl                        preparation with alcohol
             ↓                                           ↓
        gel pressing                                alcohol recovery 
             ↓                                           ↓
          drying                                      drying
             ↓                                           ↓ 
          milling                                     milling 
             ↓                                           ↓ 
          blending                                    blending
             ↓                                           ↓
     gel refined carrageenan                     refined carrageenan

Refined
The essential difference in the refining process is that the carrageenan is first dissolved and filtered to remove cell wall debris. The carrageenan is then precipitated from the clear solution, either by isopropyl alcohol (propan-2-ol) or by potassium chloride.

Mixed processing
A hybrid technology in which seaweed is treated heterogeneously as in the semirefined process exists, but alcohol or high salt levels are used to inhibit dissolution. This process is often used on South American seaweeds and gives some of the cost benefits of semirefined processing, while allowing a wider range of seaweeds to be processed, however, the naturally low cellulose levels in some South American seaweeds allow them to be heterogeneously processed and still be sold under the EU refined specification.

Grades 

There are two basic grades of carrageenan, refined (RC) and semi-refined (SRC). In the United States, both grades are labeled as carrageenan. In the European Union, refined carrageenan is designated by the E number E-407 and semi-refined carrageenan as E-407a. Refined carrageenan has a 2% maximum for acid-insoluble material and is produced by alcohol precipitation or potassium chloride gel press process. Semi-refined carrageenan has a much higher cellulose content and is produced in a less complex process. Indonesia, the Philippines, and Chile are three main sources of raw material and extracted carrageenan.

Uses and applications

Food and other domestic uses
 Desserts, ice cream, cream, milkshakes, yogurts, salad dressings, sweetened condensed milks
 Sauces: to increase viscosity
 Beer: clarifier to remove haze-causing proteins
 Pâtés and processed meats (e.g., ham): substitute for fat, increase water retention, increase volume, or improve slicing
 Toothpaste: stabilizer to prevent constituents separating
 Fruit Gushers: ingredient in the encapsulated gel
 Fire fighting foam: thickener to cause foam to become sticky
 Shampoo and cosmetic creams: thickener
 Air freshener gels
 Marbling: the ancient art of paper and fabric marbling uses a carrageenan mixture on which to float paints or inks; the paper or fabric is then laid on it, absorbing the colours
 Shoe polish: to increase viscosity
 Biotechnology: to immobilize cells and enzymes
 Pharmaceuticals: used as an inactive excipient in pills and tablets
 Soy milk and other plant milks: to thicken
 Diet sodas: to enhance texture and suspend flavours
 Pet food
 Personal lubricants
 Vegetarian hot dogs

Regulatory status

In the U.S., carrageenan is allowed under FDA regulations as a direct food additive and is considered safe when used in the amount necessary as an emulsifier, stabilizer, or thickener in foods, except those standardized foods that do not provide for such use. FDA also reviewed carrageenan safety for infant formula. The European Food Safety Authority concluded "there is no evidence of any adverse effects in humans from exposure to food-grade carrageenan, or that exposure to degraded carrageenan from use of food-grade carrageenan is occurring", Furthermore, the Joint FAO/WHO expert committee on food additives stated in a July 2014 review of carrageenan "that the use of carrageenan in infant formula or formula for special medical purposes at concentrations up to 1000 mg/L is not of concern".

Although the National Organic Program (NOP) had added carrageenan to its National List of additives allowed to be included in organic foods in 2003, and reviewed and reauthorized it in 2008, noting it as "critical to organic production and handling operations", on November 18, 2016, the NOP's National Organic Standards Board (NOSB) voted to recommend carrageenan be removed from the National List of additives allowed in organic food production.

On April 4, 2018, the Agricultural Marketing Service (AMS) (USDA) published a document to announce the renewal of carrageenan on the National List, allowing its continued use in food products. The document states,The NOSB recommended removing carrageenan because they determined that alternative materials, such as gellan gum, guar gum, or xanthan gum, are available for use in organic products ... AMS found sufficient evidence in public comments to the NOSB that carrageenan continues to be necessary for handling agricultural products because of the unavailability of wholly natural substitutes (§ 6517(c)(1)(ii)). Carrageenan has specific uses in an array of agricultural products, and public comments reported that potential substitutes do not adequately replicate the functions of carrageenan across the broad scope of use. Therefore, carrageenan continues to meet the OFPA criteria for inclusion on the National List.The rule went into effect May 29, 2018.

In a 2015 review, the Joint Expert Committee of the Food and Agriculture Organization of the United Nations and World Health Organization on Food Additives released a technical report in 2015 on the use of carrageenan in infant formula and found that the additive was "not of concern" in infant formula as food for special medical purposes at concentrations up to 1000 milligrams per litre. The use of carrageenan in infant formula, organic or otherwise, is prohibited in the EU for precautionary reasons, but is permitted in other food items. In 2018, the European Food Safety Authority (EFSA) reported that safety of carrageenan in food products is based on an ADI of 75 mg/kg body weight per day.

In the UK, the Food Standards Agency issued a product recall for sweets containing carrageenan, stating that carrageenan "is not permitted as an ingredient in jelly confectionery products as it presents a choking hazard".

Toxicity research

As of 2018, carrageenan was deemed non-toxic under certain consumption levels (75 mg/kg bw per day), although further research was recommended, mainly focused on the fate of carrageenan during and after digestion, and on any subsequent metabolites.

See also 
 Agar
 List of food additives
 Pectin
 Alginic acid

References

Further reading 
 McHugh, Dennis J. FAO Fisheries Technical Paper 288 - Production and Utilization of Products from Commercial Seaweeds, Chapter 3 - Production, Properties and Uses of Carrageenan, Food and Agriculture Organization, Rome, 1987
 Guiry, Michael D.R. Carrageenans, The Seaweed Site: information on marine algae.

External links

Edible thickening agents
Polysaccharides
IARC Group 2B carcinogens
Personal lubricants
Algal food ingredients
Microbicides
Food stabilizers
E-number additives